Jabulani Maluleke (born 17 March 1982 in Soweto) is a South African football (soccer) midfielder.

References

1982 births
Living people
South African soccer players
Association football midfielders
Dynamos F.C. (South Africa) players
Dangerous Darkies players
Black Leopards F.C. players
SuperSport United F.C. players
Polokwane City F.C. players
Sekhukhune United F.C. players
Sportspeople from Soweto